Thai Indians are Thai people with full or partial Indian ancestry.  But these ancestral ties are usually left out of statistics. About 65,000 Indian Thais have full Thai citizenship, but around 400,000 persons of Indian origin settled in Thailand mainly in the urban cities.

Migration history
Since ancient time, there have been various exchanges between the Indians and Thailand. Modern Indian communities have been around since the 1860s of the British Raj era. Most of the Indians arrived in the last century, notably from Tamil Nadu and other areas of Southern India. Some others came from Northern India such as Delhi, Punjab, Rajasthan  and some from Gujarat. Buddhism and Hinduism originally arrived in Thailand from India and spread over the centuries.

Some Thai Muslims, especially in the Southern part of Thailand, have Indian ancestry.

The historical number of the Indian population in Thailand can be seen in British consular statistics; however, these figures often lumped Indians together with Sinhalese and Malays. According to 1912 statistics, there were 30 Indians registered in the Chiengmai (Chiang Mai) consular district, 41 Indians and Malays in the Puket (Phuket) consular district, 40 Indians and Malays in the Senggora (Songkhla) consular district, and 423 Indians, Sinhalese, and Malays in the Bangkok consular district. These figures were also believed to be a gross undercount of the true population; for example, the Bangkok consular district had registered only 517 British subjects, but other estimates claimed the number was 20 times higher.

Notable people
Aloke Lohia - Billionaire Businessman
Ammar Siamwalla - One of Thailand's most prominent economists
Lek Nana - Businessman and Politician
Napakpapha Nakprasitte - Thai actress and Model
Savika Chaiyadej - Thai soap actress
Nishita Shah - Businesswoman
Ratana Pestonji - Thai film director, producer, screenwriter and cinematographer
Santi Thakral - Member of the Privy Council of King Bhumibol Adulyadej of Thailand
Vidya Dhar Shukla - Chief Hindu priest of Thailand

See also
Demographics of Thailand
Religion in Thailand
Phahurat
Hinduism in Southeast Asia
Sikhism in Thailand
 Nepalis in Thailand
 Pakistanis in Thailand
Mariamman Temple, Bangkok

References

External links
India Thailand Trade
Thai Indian Update
Thaindian.com
Thai Sikh Organization

Masala Magazine for Indians In Thailand

 
 
Indians
India–Thailand relations